There were 688 participants on the Gaza flotilla from 41 nations. The flotilla was raided and captured by Israeli naval forces on 31 May 2010, when nine participants were killed and seven IDF commandos were injured.

Notable flotilla passengers included Mairead Corrigan, Nobel Peace prize winner, Denis Halliday, former UN Assistant Secretary-General, Edward Peck, former U.S. Ambassador to Iraq, Fehmi Bülent Yıldırım, the İHH president, Haneen Zoabi, an Israeli-Arab member of Knesset, Raed Salah, the leader of the northern branch of the Islamic Movement in Israel, Hilarion Capucci, a retired titular archbishop previously convicted by Israel of smuggling arms to the Palestine Liberation Army.

Nationalities
These are the nationalities participated:

Gaza flotilla participants killed in the raid

People on board the raided Gaza flotilla ships, excluding those killed

MV Rachel Corrie Passengers 

Some people who were on board MV Rachel Corrie are:

References

See also
Gaza journey of MV Rachel Corrie
Gaza flotilla raid

Political activism
Gaza flotilla raid